Zine Eddine Sekhri is a Paralympian athlete from Algeria competing mainly in category T13 middle-distance events.

He competed in the 2008 Summer Paralympics in Beijing, China.  There he won a bronze medal in the men's 800 metres - T13 event and finished sixth in the men's 400 metres - T13 event

External links
 

Paralympic athletes of Algeria
Athletes (track and field) at the 2008 Summer Paralympics
Paralympic bronze medalists for Algeria
Living people
Athletes (track and field) at the 2012 Summer Paralympics
Year of birth missing (living people)
Medalists at the 2008 Summer Paralympics
Paralympic medalists in athletics (track and field)
21st-century Algerian people
Algerian male middle-distance runners
20th-century Algerian people